Ma and Pa Kettle Back on the Farm is a 1951 American comedy film directed by Edward Sedgwick. It is the third installment of Universal-International's Ma and Pa Kettle series starring Marjorie Main and Percy Kilbride. It was also the last completed film of director Sedgwick's long career.

Plot
In July 1950, Ma and Pa Kettle come home after their fun and exciting trip to New York City only to find out that they're going to become grandparents. Tom's wife Kim is expecting a child. As Tom frets about the pregnancy, the whole Kettle household is happy with the family's newest addition. Right in the middle of their breakfast the Kettles receive a telegram delivered by Alvin, the Western Union delivery boy, from Jonathan and Elizabeth Parker (Kim's parents) declaring that they will soon arrive at the Kettle house to see the newborn.

Ma hushes everybody, but to her surprise the in-laws have just arrived and are waiting for them outside. Ma goes out to greet them but the Kettle children fight over the Parkers' luggage which they're supposed to bring into the house. The Parkers are refined Bostonians and their first impression of the Kettles leaves them astounded. Ma and Elizabeth don't get acquainted very well—which is the reason why the Kettles leave their ultra-modern house to return to their beloved ramshackle farmhouse.

While Pa and his Indian friends, Geoduck and the mute Crowbar, go to work blasting a new well, two shady men searching for uranium deposits find evidence of the ore in the farm soil. Soon after, Pa falls into the well, and when he climbs out he finds that he can generate electricity spontaneously. Mr. Parker, a retired mine owner who, unlike his wife, appreciates the Kettles' hominess, deduces that Pa's radioactivity must be due to uranium-rich soil in his coveralls pockets. He informs the Kettles that they are about to become very rich. They then discuss with Geoduck, Crowbar and their friend, local salesman Billy Reed, how they would like to share the profits among them all.

While they talk, however, Tom arrives and despondently tells them that Mrs. Parker has talked Kim into leaving him and taking the baby from the hospital, where it is staying because of a cold, back to Boston. That night, Billy, Geoduck and Crowbar sneak into the hospital and attempt to steal the baby back for Tom. Each man, however, grabs a girl baby instead of little Jonathan. When the sheriff arrives, Ma and Pa have to trick him into taking the babies back without pressing charges. The next day, the two shady men inform Ma and Pa that they have bought the farm by paying the back taxes owed on it, but Mr. Parker brings in a uranium expert to convince them that the land is useless, and the men agree to give Pa the deed to the farm and ten dollars. As soon as they leave, however, the expert reveals to Parker that the land really is barren, and Mr. Parker realizes that the only radioactive element on the property is Pa's coveralls, which his nephew wore during overseas atomic bomb tests.

As the Kettles celebrate the payment of their back taxes, Tom announces that Mrs. Parker and Kim have boarded a train to Boston, causing Mr. Parker, Tom, Ma and Pa to give chase. They manage to stop the train, and when Tom stands up to Kim and Mr. Parker rebukes his wife for the first time, Mrs. Parker realizes the error of her ways. She and Ma, however, do not disembark in time, and are forced to stop the train in the middle of a field and use a railroad hand car to get home. By the time that Pa, Mr. Parker, Tom and Kim return to the house, Ma and Mrs. Parker have prepared dinner for the whole happy family.

Cast
Marjorie Main as Ma Kettle
Percy Kilbride as Pa Kettle
Richard Long as Tom Kettle
Meg Randall as Kim Parker Kettle
Ray Collins as Jonathan Parker
Barbara Brown as Elizabeth Parker
Emory Parnell as Billy Reed
Peter Leeds as Manson 
Teddy Hart as Crowbar
Oliver Blake as Geoduck
Rex Lease as Clallan County Sheriff (uncredited)
J.P. Sloane as Billy Kettle (uncredited)
Edward Clark (uncredited)
Edmund Cobb (uncredited)
Harold Goodwin (uncredited)
Jerry Hausner (uncredited)
Teddy Infuhr (uncredited)
Jack Ingram (uncredited)
Sherry Jackson (uncredited)
Harry von Zell (uncredited)

Production
The film was originally entitled Ma and Pa Kettle Have a Baby. Filming started 11 February 1950.

References

External links

1951 films
Films directed by Edward Sedgwick
Ma and Pa Kettle
Films set in 1950
Films set in Washington (state)
American comedy films
1951 comedy films
American black-and-white films
1950s English-language films
1950s American films